Paris Interlude is a 1934 American drama film directed by Edwin L. Marin and written by Wells Root. The film stars Madge Evans, Otto Kruger, Robert Young, Una Merkel, Ted Healy and Louise Henry. The film was released on July 27, 1934, by Metro-Goldwyn-Mayer.

Plot
Julie has a star crossed romance with Sam, leaning on pal Cassie when unhappy. When Sam is believed dead Cassie urges Julie to take up with good guy Pat. When Sam returns Cassie tries to do the right thing by her best friend.

Cast
Madge Evans as Julie
Otto Kruger as Sam
Robert Young as Pat
Una Merkel as Cassie
Ted Healy as Jimmy
Louise Henry as Mary Louise
Edward Brophy as Ham
George Meeker as Rex
Bert Roach as Noble
Richard Tucker as Stevens

References

External links
 

1934 films
1930s English-language films
American drama films
1934 drama films
Metro-Goldwyn-Mayer films
Films directed by Edwin L. Marin
American black-and-white films
1930s American films